Antonio Lewis (born July 8, 1990), better known by his stage name Zombie Juice, is an American rapper from Brooklyn, New York. He attended Midwood High School in Brooklyn. He is one third of the hip hop trio Flatbush Zombies.  Along with his rapping career, Lewis also directed a music video for the Flatbush Zombies song "Thugnificense".

Discography

Studio albums

EP

Mixtapes

Singles

Guest appearances

References

1990 births
Living people
21st-century American rappers
21st-century American male musicians
American male rappers
People from Flatbush, Brooklyn
Rappers from Brooklyn
Beast Coast members